Teenage Mutant Ninja Turtles is an American animated television series developed by Lloyd Goldfine, and based on the comic book characters of the same name created by Kevin Eastman and Peter Laird. The series premiered on February 8, 2003, as part of Fox's FoxBox programming block (later known as 4Kids TV) and ended on February 28, 2009.

The series was announced on May 7, 2002. It was co-produced by 4Kids Entertainment (as its first in-house animated production) and franchise creators Mirage Studios, which co-owned rights to the show, with animation provided by the studio Dong Woo.

The series ran for 156 episodes over seven seasons. For its final season in 2008, the show moved from Fox to The CW. 4Kids also licensed the first 40 episodes to Cartoon Network in 2003, and Cartoon Network aired the series until mid 2005.

Series Overview

Seasons 1–5
Unlike the 1987 TV series, the 2003 series more closely matches the tone of the original comics, with a greater emphasis on action and themes of familial bonds. As a result, the 2003 series is more adult-oriented, while still being considered appropriate for younger audiences. The series adapts a large scope of story arcs from the comics, with the Turtles' adventures combining elements of both fantasy and science fiction. They also fight the Foot Clan led by Shredder as well as the Purple Dragons led by Hun and the mad scientist Baxter Stockman. Later seasons have the Turtles contending with Agent John Bishop of the Earth Protection Force. Early on in the second season, the Shredder is revealed to be an Utrom criminal named Ch'rell. Upon his defeat at the hands of the Turtles by the end of the third season, Ch'rell is exiled to the ice asteroid Mor Gal Tal.

During the fourth season, Karai continues to lead the Foot Clan as the very first female Shredder, Hun turns the Purple Dragons into a crime syndicate, and Baxter Stockman works for Agent John Bishop's group. Towards the end of the fourth season and the beginning of the fifth season, the series undergoes a format change as the Turtles would be recruited by the Ninja Tribunal to use new mystic abilities to combat another version of the Shredder where this one is labeled as the original Shredder before Ch'rell assumed his identity. Season five would be the last to use the original character designs and animation style with its plot concluding the series' main story line.

Seasons 6–7
The sixth season, subtitled "Fast Forward", would retool the series with a new art style and comedic tone. The season's plot focused on the Turtles being transported about 100 years into the future to the year 2105; where they meet and befriend Cody Jones, the great grandson of April and Casey. They must also contend with futurist enemies like Sh'Okanabo and his minion Viral as well as dealing with the activities of Cody's greedy and ambitious uncle Darius Dunn.

The main story would conclude in the seventh and final season, subtitled "Back to the Sewer", while sporting another redesign for the entire cast inspired by the designs from the 2007 TMNT film. After returning to the present day, the Turtles must battle a cybernetic version of the Shredder which was the result of Viral merging with the data of the exiled Utrom Shredder. There is also a running subplot centered on the engagement and wedding of April and Casey.

Turtles Forever
The 2009 television movie serves as the actual four-part finale to the 2003 series and centers around the Turtles encountering their 1987 animated counterparts, who have accidentally been transported to the 2003 Ninja Turtles' reality. To make matters worse, the 80's Shredder and Krang as well as their minions Bebop and Rocksteady free Ch'rell from his imprisonment as the redesigned Hun and Karai realign themselves with the released Ch'rell.

Cast & Characters

Main
Leonardo / Leo (voiced by Michael Sinterniklaas) is the oldest brother and the leader of the team who wields two Katana Swords.
Raphael / Raph (voiced by Greg Abbey) is the second oldest brother and the muscle of the team who has a temper and sometimes argues with Leo over the actions they must take. He wields two Sais as weapons.
Donatello / Donnie or Don (voiced by Sam Riegel) is the second youngest brother and the brains of the team who is in charge of creating their gadgets, he wields a bo staff as his weapon.
Michelangelo / Mikey (voiced by Wayne Grayson) is the youngest brother and the jokester of the team. He loves comic books and sometimes disguises himself as the superhero Turtle Titan. His weapon of choice is Nunchucks.
Splinter (voiced by Darren Dunstan) is the master and father of the Turtles who finds them prior to their mutation and trains them in Ninjutsu. Prior to his mutation, he was the pet of Hamato Yoshi and learned ninjutsu by mimicking his moves.

Allies
April O'Neil (voiced by Veronica Taylor) is a human who used to be Dr. Stockman's assistant, but after learning his ulterior motives is saved by the Turtles and becomes their friend.
Casey Jones (voiced by Marc Thompson) is a human whose father's shop was set on fire by the Purple Dragon and they later killed his father. He became a vigilante to fight them but has anger issues, but manages to tune it down after meeting and befriending the Turtles.
Mortu (voiced by Dan Green) is a benevolent Utrom and an ally of the Turtles. He was the captain of the ship which was transporting the imprisoned Ch'rell on board and become stranded on Earth with his fellow Utroms when Ch'rell escaped and caused them to crash. He later met Hamato Yoshi and recruited him to become a guardian of the Utroms. He later saved the Turtles from their final battle with the Utrom Shredder and had him stand trial for his crimes.
Professor Zaton Honeycutt / Fugitoid (voiced by Oliver Wyman) is a D'Hoonnib scientist and a friend of the Turtles. After an accident, his mind is trapped in the body of his robot assistant. He possesses the blueprints of a Teleportation device that both the Federation and the Triceratons seek to win the war against each other. Honeycutt ultimately sacrifices himself to end the war but his consciousness survives in one of the Earth's satellites.
Leatherhead (voiced by F.B. Owsen for season 1-3 and Gary K. Lewis from season 4 onward) is a mutant crocodile and a friend of the Turtles. He was a pet who was dumped into the sewers and discovered by the Utroms. After being accidentally mutated, he would assist the Utroms in creating their teleportation device and return to their homeworld. After becoming separated from the Utroms, he was lost in the sewers where he met and befriended the Turtles. He was later captured and experimented on by Agent Bishop, causing his anger to become unstable. Leatherhead is a genius like Donatello and helped the Turtles to find a cure for him when he was mutated once again.
Traximus (voiced by F.B. Owsen) is a Triceraton gladiator and an ally of the turtles. He was once the supreme commander of the republic's army and the Prime Leader's right hand man until he questioned the Prime Leader's dishonorable ways which caused him to be dishonored. He later leads a revolution against Zanramon and dethrones him.
Ninja Tribunal are a group of four ninja masters. they were once five warriors who defeated the Tengu Shredder, but one of them, Oroku Saki, made a deal with the demon and allowed his spirit to inhabite his body in exchange for power. The other four traveled across the world and trained their body and spirit to counter their old comrade and ultimately succeed in sealing him away. Afterwards they have tried to prevent his return and have passed their knowledge of martial arts, which later came to be known as Ninjutsu to others. Their members are: Kon Shisho (voiced by David Zen Mansley) master of spirit, Juto Shisho (voiced by Marc Thompson) master of weapons, Chikara Shisho (voiced by Lenore Zann) master of strength, Hisomi Shisho, master of stealth who is silence and the Ancient One (voiced by David Chen) their student and the master and father figure of Hamato Yoshi who joins them on their request.
Acolytes are the students of the Ninja Tribunal that they seek to train and prepare them for the threat of the Tengu Shredder. They are the Ninja Turtles and four other humans; Faraji Nagala (voiced by David Moo) who bonds with Leonardo, Adam McKay (voiced by Britton Herring) who bonds with Donatello, Joei Reynard (voiced by Rebecca Soler) who bonds with Raphael and Tora Yoshida (voiced by David Chen) who bonds with Michelangelo.
Cody Jones (voiced by Christopher C. Adams) is the great grand son of April and Casey and the heir of the O'Neil Tech. He is the Turtles' friend and guide in the year 2105 during the Fast Forward season. After his Time Portal accidentally brings the Turtles to his time, he helps them to become accustomed to the Earth's new way of life while trying to rebuild the Time Window and send them home.
Serling (voiced by Marc Thompson) is Cody's loyal robotic servant who is usually annoyed by the Turtles, he later gains a battle mode known as Turtle X which Cody can control. When the Turtles are finally going back to their own time, he is infected by Viral and goes with them and later helps the Turtles defeat the Cyber Shredder.

Antagonists
Oroku Saki / The Shredder (voiced by Scottie Ray) is the archenemy of the Turtles and Splinter and serves as the main antagonist of the series. He is the villainous founder and leader of the Foot Clan who masquerades as a benevolent Japanese philanthropist. The Shredder is revealed to be an evil Utrom warlord named Ch'rell, who has been stranded on earth for centuries and indirectly had a hand in the Turtles and Splinter's creation. Other individuals have also assumed the mantle of the Shredder, including the original demonic Tengu Shredder from ancient Japan, Ch'rell's adopted daughter Karai, and an artificial intelligence copy of Ch'rell known as the Cyber Shredder. In a possible future, the Utrom Shredder, Tengu Shredder and Cyber Shredder are engaged in a war for control of New York City.
Hun (voiced by Greg Carey) is the leader of the Purple Dragon and Shredder's second in command until the end of season 2. he was responsible for burning down the shop of Casey's father, as such the two became enemies, he was also going to kill Hamato Yoshi but Splinter left a scar on his face. Hun is very loyal to the Shredder and will do anything to gain his favor. After Utrom Shredder's defeat, Hun returns to Purple Dragon and turns it from a street gang into a crime syndicate.
Karai (voiced by Karen Neill) is Utrom Shredder's adopted daughter and his second in command from the end of season 2, replacing Hun. Due to her sense of honor, she is usually conflicted with orders she receives from the Shredder. After his defeat, she takes control of the Foot and decides to take vengeance on the Turtles for his exile, becoming one of their main enemies, but after being forced to team up with them against the Tengu Shredder, she disbands the foot and declares a truce with the Turtles.
Foot Mystics, also known as the Heralds of the Shredder, are five mystic beings, each presenting one of the five elements. (Metal, Earth, Fire: voiced by Sean Schemmel), (Water and Wind: voiced by Brian Maillard). They are the servants of the Tengu Shredder and have also served Utrom Shredder and Karai through an artifact known as the heart of Tengu, after they manipulated the Turtles and Agent Bishop to steal and destroy it, they were freed and set out to revive their master.
Master Khan (voiced by Sean Schemmel) is a high ranking Foot Ninja and the first lieutenant of the Cyber Shredder who was rebuilding the Foot Clan for whenever he would return. It was revealed in an alternative future that he had destroyed the Turtles.
Doctor Baxter Stockman (voiced by Scott Williams) is a scientist working for the Foot clan and the Shredder. After suffering severe punishments at the hands of the Shredder, he starts to scheme against him and after his defeat, joins the Earth Protection Force and Agent Bishop.
General Blanque (voiced by Oliver Wyman) is the leader of the D'Hoonnib Federation who seeks to use Fugitoid's teleportation device and destroy the Triceratons, he is ultimately defeated by the Turtles and is arrested along with Zanramon.
Prime Leader Zanramon (voiced by David Brimmer) is the despotic Prime Leader of the Triceraton Republic who seeks to use the Fugitoid's teleportation device and win the war against the Federation, he is dethroned by Traximus and imprisoned alongside Blanque.
Commander Mozar (voiced by Dan Green) is Zanramon's second in command and the Supreme commander of the republic's army. Despite his loyalty, he comes to question Zanramon's corruption and honor when he cares about nothing but personal gain in the middle of a war and ultimately orders his men to stand down against Traximus' revolution.
Agent John Bishop (voiced by David Zen Mansley) is the leader of the Earth Protection Force (E.P.F). He was abducted and experimented on by aliens back in the 1815, as such he deems any extraterrestrial as a threat and becomes one of the Turtles' main enemies after Utrom Shredder's defeat. After being saved by an alien during a failed experiment, he starts to have second thoughts about them and decides to seek allies instead of enemies and ultimately becomes the president of the Pan Galactic alliance (P.G.A) and an ally of the Turtles in the Fast Forward season.
Darius Dun (voiced by David Zen Mansley) is Cody's uncle and guardian and one of the main antagonists of the Fast Forward season. He has taken control of O'Neil Tech and uses it as a cover for his criminal activities which is making weapons and selling them in the black market. He first has a race of endangered warriors known as Inuwashi Gunjin as his slaves and after losing them are provided with the dark counterparts of the Turtles known as Dark Turtles.
Sh'Okonabo ( voiced by Sean Schemmel) is an alien Kanabo warlord and one of the main antagonists of the Fast Forward season. He seeks to unleash the Day of Awakening on Earth, which is turning the inhabitants of Earth into Kanabo Drones and have his race thrive on Earth until its resources are finished but finds the Earth's sun as an obstacle. To fulfill his plans, he teams up with Darius Dun and gives him the Dark Turtles, monsters that he created by combining the Turtles DNA with that of Kanabos and in return receives the blueprints of the Time Window.
Viral (voiced by Eva Kaminsky) is a sentient computer virus and Sh'Okonabo's assistant. She aids her master on his quest to bring the Day of Awakening but is ultimately torn to bits by Cody and Serling, but returns and uses Serling to get revenge on the Turtles and goes to their time, she accidentally releases the Cyber Shredder from his resting place and becomes a part of him.

Others
Hamato Yoshi (voiced by Eric Stuart) is Splinter's owner and a guardian of the Utroms. he was once a homeless boy along with his friend Yukio Mashimi, but both were adopted and trained by the Ancient One and became guardians of the Utroms after learning their secrets. He and Mashimi were in love with Ancient One's daughter Tang Shen who was in love with Yoshi, causing Mashimi to become jealous, murder her and join the Foot. Yoshi avenges Tang Shen and kills Mashimi for his betrayal. He later moves to New York along with the Utroms, where his captured and tortured by the Foot Ninjas to reveal the Utrom's location and was murdered by the Shredder when he wouldn't talk. Afterwards Splinter leaves and eventually finds the Turtles.
Tang Shen (voiced by Karen Neil) is the adopted daughter of the Ancient One, adopted sister of Yoshi and Mashimi and the former's lover. She also took the hungry Splinter as a pet. She was murdered by Mashimi who was jealous of Yoshi for winning Tang Shen's heart and his achievements as a guardian.
Yukio Mashimi (voiced by Sean Schemmel) is an orphaned boy and Yoshi's friend who was adopted and trained by the Ancient One and became a guardian of the Utroms along with Yoshi after learning their secrets. He was also in love with Tang Shen, who was in love with Yoshi, which along with his achievements as a guardian caused Mashimi to become jealous of Yoshi, murder Tang Shen and betray the Utroms to the Foot and the Shredder. Mashimi is murdered by Yoshi for his betrayal.
Starlee Hambrath (voiced by Amanda Brown) is a bright and highly intelligent O'Neil Tech intern from the planet Omatran and a friend of Cody and the Turtles in the Fast Forward season. She is shown to have a crush on Cody.
Torbin Zixx (voiced by David Elliott) is a intergalactic smuggler and mercenary who usually outsmarts the Turtles and uses them for his own end either as an ally or an enemy.

Crew
 Susan Blu – Voice Director (seasons 1–5)
 Roy Burdine – Voice Director (seasons 6–7)
 Darren Dunstan – ADR Voice Director

Production
In May 2002, 4Kids Entertainment announced to produce a new animated Teenage Mutant Ninja Turtles TV series for the FoxBox programming block to air on Saturday mornings. The series was renewed for a second season in the summer of 2003; the third in May 2004; the fourth in April 2005. The "Ninja Tribunal" was originally intended to be the fifth and final season of the 2003 Teenage Mutant Ninja Turtles animated series, but the schedule was changed to try to increase interest in the series and "Fast Forward" became the fifth season. The "Ninja Tribunal" episodes were scheduled to be released on DVD sometime in early 2007, but 4Kids Entertainment later removed them from their release schedule and the season was promoted in commercials as Teenage Mutant Ninja Turtles: The Lost Episodes.

Series development was headed by producer Lloyd Goldfine, who had known the Ninja Turtles since the original Mirage Studios comics and declared he "loved the charm of the cartoon", but much preferred the idea of turtles raised to be ninja assassins, and was interested in using said plot while also being family friendly. Once he heard 4Kids had an interest in the franchise, Goldfine suggested going straight to Mirage for guidance, and then he and other company representatives went to the company's headquarters in Northampton, Massachusetts.  Turtles co-creator Peter Laird and Mirage CEO Gary Richardson approved their pitch, and Mirage remained very close during development, with Laird reading every outline and draft of the script, and approving most of the character designs.

Home video

The series has been released to home video, but the complete series has yet to be released, with the seventh season being the only one with no DVD release of any kind.

Broadcast history
Teenage Mutant Ninja Turtles originally aired in the US on Fox for its first six seasons from February 8, 2003, to October 27, 2007. It then aired on The CW for reruns of its first six seasons, its seventh and final season and Turtles Forever from September 13, 2008, to February 28, 2009.

On November 24, 2003, 4Kids announced that they had licensed the first 40 episodes of Teenage Mutant Ninja Turtles to Cartoon Network. 4Kids' CEO, Al Kahn, said he was "pleased to be able to broadcast the series with Cartoon Network. Now that we're adding the Cartoon Network audience, we're certain that many more kids across the country will become part of the growing craze and get 'Turtle-ized.'" The show aired on Cartoon Network until March 24, 2007.

Turtles Forever also aired on Nickelodeon on August 24, 2010. The show was eventually broadcast on Nicktoons from 2014 to 2015.

The show (excluding season 5 and Turtles Forever) aired in the Republic of Ireland on RTE Two from September 17, 2003, to 2009.

The series is currently available for streaming on Paramount+, and Pluto TV as part of their "Totally Turtles" channel, which the latter also includes the 2012 series.

Critical reception
Teenage Mutant Ninja Turtles received widespread acclaim and was commercially successful throughout its first five seasons, receiving wide critical praise for the faithfulness to the source material, the storytelling, character development, action, darker tone, humor, the theme song, background music, voice acting, animation and appeal to all ages. It also garnered high ratings for a 4Kids Saturday morning cartoon and shortly after the premiere became the highest-rated and most popular children's television show in the US. Unleash the Fanboy praised the series for its connection to the comic books in story and tone, and it helps that co-creator Peter Laird was closely involved with the series, making sure things stayed on the right path.

4Kids was known for its controversial history of censoring anime, but the series was acclaimed for trying to follow the dark and gritty tone of the original Mirage comics. However, due to 4Kids having to keep their ratings under PG, the last two seasons of series, Fast Forward and Back to the Sewer, were met with negative reception from fans and critics alike.

Several of the characters introduced in the series would later appear in subsequent publications of the TMNT franchise. Hun was introduced into the Mirage Comics with the issue Tales of the Teenage Mutant Ninja Turtles Volume 2 No. 56 in March 2009, and also appears as a recurring figure in the IDW comic series and in the 2012 animated series, as does Agent Bishop. Angel, Ch'rell, Darius Dun and the Street Phantoms would also be featured in the IDW comics, and the Triceraton Mozar as an antagonist during season 4 of the 2012 series.

References

External links

 
 

 
2000s American animated television series
2000s American comic science fiction television series
2003 American television series debuts
2010 American television series endings
CW4Kids original programming
Television shows set in New York City
English-language television shows
Works by Christopher Yost
Television shows set in Massachusetts
American children's animated action television series
American children's animated adventure television series
American children's animated comic science fiction television series
American children's animated drama television series
American children's animated science fantasy television series
American children's animated superhero television series
Animated television series reboots
Anime-influenced Western animated television series
Television shows based on comics
Animated television series about turtles
Teen animated television series
Teen superhero television series
4Kids Entertainment